Oxyurichthys stigmalophius, commonly known as the spotfin goby, is a species of goby found in the western central Atlantic (Florida, Bahamas and the southern Gulf of Mexico to Suriname).

References

Robins, C.R. and G.C. Ray, 1986. A field guide to Atlantic coast fishes of North America. Houghton Mifflin Company, Boston, U.S.A. 354 p.

stigmalophius
Taxa named by Giles Willis Mead
Taxa named by James Erwin Böhlke
Fish described in 1958